Triple Feature is a collection of works by American author Joe R. Lansdale, published in a very limited edition by Subterranean Press in 1999.

It contains:

For Just One Hour
The Headstone (written with Bill Pronzini and Jeffrey Wallman)
The Original Lengueenies

The Headstone has not been included in any other collection.  The other two stories were included in For a Few Stories More.

References

External links
Author's official website
Publisher's website

Short story collections by Joe R. Lansdale
1999 short story collections
Mystery short story collections
Horror short story collections
Works by Joe R. Lansdale
Subterranean Press books